"Anyone for Tennis" is a song by the British rock band Cream. It was used as the theme song for the 1968 film The Savage Seven and is titled "Anyone for Tennis (Theme from the Savage Seven)" for the soundtrack album.  The subtitle was dropped for Cream's single releases.

Guitarist Eric Clapton wrote the song for the 1968 film The Savage Seven.  It was his second collaboration with lyricist Martin Sharp (their first was "Tales of Brave Ulysses").  According to biographer Michael Schumacher, Clapton was unable to find a melody that suited him, despite expending considerable time.

The song was recorded during the sessions for Cream's third album, Wheels of Fire.  However, it was released on The Savage Seven soundtrack album and as a single instead.  Backed with "Pressed Rat and Warthog", it reached number 64 on the American Billboard Hot 100 in May 1968 and number 40 on the UK Singles Chart in June 1968.

Billboard described the single as an "unusual piece of folk-rock material with a clever dance arrangement."

Cream mimed the song during their promotional appearance on The Smothers Brothers Comedy Hour in May 1968 with a video middle section in which the band carry tennis rackets.

"Anyone for Tennis" is included on several Cream compilation albums, including Superstarshine Vol. 6 / Cream (1972), Strange Brew: The Very Best of Cream (1983), The Very Best of Cream (1995),  and the boxed set Those Were the Days (1997). It is also included in the Clapton boxed set Crossroads (1988).

The stereo recording of this song is encoded with the Haeco-CSG system. It has also been included as a bonus track on some CD releases of Wheels of Fire or Goodbye.

Personnel
 Eric Clapton – lead vocal, acoustic guitar, slide guitar
 Jack Bruce – bass guitar, recorder
 Ginger Baker – drums, percussion
 Felix Pappalardi – viola

References 

Cream (band) songs
Psychedelic songs
Songs written by Eric Clapton
Atco Records singles
Polydor Records singles
1968 songs
Psychedelic pop songs
Tennis music
Buddhism in music